Duff is a special service area in the Canadian province of Saskatchewan within the Rural Municipality (RM) of Stanley No. 215 and Census Division No. 5.

History 
Duff incorporated as a village on May 28, 1920. It dissolved its village status on January 1, 2022 in favour of becoming a special service area in the RM of Stanley No. 215.

Demographics 

See also

 List of communities in Saskatchewan
 List of special service areas in Saskatchewan

References

Special service areas in Saskatchewan
Stanley No. 215, Saskatchewan
Division No. 5, Saskatchewan